Jefferson Hall – more formally known as "Hotel C" – is a building on the West Range of the University of Virginia.  It is the traditional home of the Jefferson Literary and Debating Society; the term "Jefferson Hall" (or "Jeff Hall" or "The Hall") is sometimes used as a synonym for the organization.

Jefferson Hall is one of six original "hotels" that Thomas Jefferson designed when laying out the plans for the University of Virginia.  The hotels originally served as student dining facilities.  When not boarding students, various student organizations made use of the building as meeting space.  The Patrick Henry Society originally met in Hotel C until the group's dissolution in 1830.  The Washington Literary Society and Debating Union met there from its founding in 1835 until 1837, at which point it moved to Pavilion VII on the Lawn and, from there, to hotels on the East Range (the current incarnation of the Washington Society now meets in Hotel C on Thursday evenings). In 1837, the university's Board of Visitors granted the Jefferson Society control of the largest room in the building and, in 1841, the BOV gave the group permission to remove the walls partitioning the main level of Hotel C, leaving that floor as one large room.

The Confederate States of America used Jefferson Hall as a hospital during the American Civil War.

Jefferson Hall underwent major restoration and renovation in summer 2006.

Besides the Jefferson and Washington Societies, Jefferson Hall today is used by a wide range of student, faculty, and community groups, including the International Relations Organization.

References

External links
Excerpts of a masters thesis on Jefferson Hall
Reserve Jefferson Hall
University of Virginia

Buildings of the University of Virginia
Thomas Jefferson buildings